This is a list of butterflies of Sierra Leone. About 710 species are known from Sierra Leone, four of which are endemic.

Papilionidae

Papilioninae

Papilionini
Papilio antimachus Drury, 1782
Papilio zalmoxis Hewitson, 1864
Papilio nireus Linnaeus, 1758
Papilio chrapkowskoides nurettini Koçak, 1983
Papilio sosia Rothschild & Jordan, 1903
Papilio cynorta Fabricius, 1793
Papilio dardanus Brown, 1776
Papilio phorcas Cramer, 1775
Papilio zenobia Fabricius, 1775
Papilio cyproeofila Butler, 1868
Papilio demodocus Esper, [1798]
Papilio horribilis Butler, 1874
Papilio menestheus Drury, 1773

Leptocercini
Graphium antheus (Cramer, 1779)
Graphium policenes (Cramer, 1775)
Graphium liponesco (Suffert, 1904)
Graphium illyris (Hewitson, 1873)
Graphium angolanus baronis (Ungemach, 1932)
Graphium leonidas (Fabricius, 1793)
Graphium tynderaeus (Fabricius, 1793)
Graphium latreillianus (Godart, 1819)
Graphium adamastor (Boisduval, 1836)

Pieridae

Pseudopontiinae
Pseudopontia paradoxa (Felder & Felder, 1869)

Coliadinae
Eurema brigitta (Stoll, [1780])
Eurema desjardinsii marshalli (Butler, 1898)
Eurema regularis (Butler, 1876)
Eurema floricola leonis (Butler, 1886)
Eurema hapale (Mabille, 1882)
Eurema hecabe solifera (Butler, 1875)
Eurema senegalensis (Boisduval, 1836)
Catopsilia florella (Fabricius, 1775)

Pierinae
Colotis euippe (Linnaeus, 1758)
Nepheronia argia (Fabricius, 1775)
Nepheronia pharis (Boisduval, 1836)
Nepheronia thalassina (Boisduval, 1836)
Leptosia hybrida Bernardi, 1952
Leptosia marginea (Mabille, 1890)
Leptosia medusa (Cramer, 1777)
Leptosia wigginsi pseudalcesta Bernardi, 1965

Pierini
Appias epaphia (Cramer, [1779])
Appias phaola (Doubleday, 1847)
Appias sabina (Felder & Felder, [1865])
Appias sylvia (Fabricius, 1775)
Mylothris chloris (Fabricius, 1775)
Mylothris poppea (Cramer, 1777)
Mylothris rhodope (Fabricius, 1775)
Mylothris dimidiata Aurivillius, 1898
Belenois aurota (Fabricius, 1793)
Belenois calypso (Drury, 1773)
Belenois creona (Cramer, [1776])
Belenois hedyle ianthe (Doubleday, 1842)
Belenois hedyle rhena (Doubleday, 1846)

Lycaenidae

Miletinae

Liphyrini
Euliphyra hewitsoni Aurivillius, 1899
Euliphyra leucyania (Hewitson, 1874)
Aslauga lamborni Bethune-Baker, 1914
Aslauga marginalis Kirby, 1890

Miletini
Lachnocnema emperamus (Snellen, 1872)

Poritiinae

Liptenini
Ptelina carnuta (Hewitson, 1873)
Pentila abraxas (Westwood, 1851)
Pentila condamini Stempffer, 1963
Pentila pauli Staudinger, 1888
Pentila petreia Hewitson, 1874
Pentila petreoides Bethune-Baker, 1915
Pentila preussi Staudinger, 1888
Telipna acraea (Westwood, [1851])
Ornipholidotos tiassale Stempffer, 1969
Ornipholidotos onitshae Stempffer, 1962
Ornipholidotos issia Stempffer, 1969
Ornipholidotos nympha Libert, 2000
Torbenia wojtusiaki Libert, 2000
Mimacraea darwinia Butler, 1872
Mimacraea neurata Holland, 1895
Mimeresia debora catori (Bethune-Baker, 1904)
Mimeresia issia Stempffer, 1969
Mimeresia libentina (Hewitson, 1866)
Mimeresia moyambina (Bethune-Baker, 1904)
Liptena albicans Cator, 1904
Liptena catalina (Grose-Smith & Kirby, 1887)
Liptena helena (Druce, 1888)
Liptena praestans (Grose-Smith, 1901)
Liptena bia Larsen & Warren-Gash, 2008
Liptena septistrigata (Bethune-Baker, 1903)
Liptena similis (Kirby, 1890)
Liptena simplicia Möschler, 1887
Liptena submacula liberiana Stempffer, Bennett & May, 1974
Liptena xanthostola coomassiensis Hawker-Smith, 1933
Kakumia otlauga (Grose-Smith & Kirby, 1890)
Tetrarhanis baralingam (Larsen, 1998)
Tetrarhanis diversa (Bethune-Baker, 1904)
Falcuna campimus (Holland, 1890)
Falcuna leonensis Stempffer & Bennett, 1963
Larinopoda eurema (Plötz, 1880)
Micropentila brunnea (Kirby, 1887)
Micropentila dorothea Bethune-Baker, 1903
Micropentila mabangi Bethune-Baker, 1904
Pseuderesia eleaza (Hewitson, 1873)
Eresina fontainei Stempffer, 1956
Eresina fusca (Cator, 1904)
Eresina jacksoni Stempffer, 1961
Eresina maesseni Stempffer, 1956
Eresina rougeoti Stempffer, 1956
Eresina saundersi Stempffer, 1956
Eresina theodori Stempffer, 1956
Eresiomera bicolor (Grose-Smith & Kirby, 1890)
Eresiomera isca occidentalis Collins & Larsen, 1998
Eresiomera petersi (Stempffer & Bennett, 1956)
Citrinophila erastus (Hewitson, 1866)
Citrinophila marginalis Kirby, 1887
Citrinophila similis (Kirby, 1887)
Argyrocheila undifera Staudinger, 1892

Epitolini
Iridana incredibilis (Staudinger, 1891)
Iridana rougeoti Stempffer, 1964
Teratoneura isabellae Dudgeon, 1909
Epitola posthumus (Fabricius, 1793)
Epitola urania Kirby, 1887
Epitola uranioides occidentalis Libert, 1999
Cerautola ceraunia (Hewitson, 1873)
Cerautola crowleyi (Sharpe, 1890)
Cerautola miranda (Staudinger, 1889)
Geritola albomaculata (Bethune-Baker, 1903)
Geritola virginea (Bethune-Baker, 1904)
Stempfferia baoule Libert, 1999
Stempfferia cercene (Hewitson, 1873)
Stempfferia ciconia (Grose-Smith & Kirby, 1892)
Stempfferia dorothea (Bethune-Baker, 1904)
Stempfferia kholifa (Bethune-Baker, 1904)
Stempfferia leonina (Staudinger, 1888)
Stempfferia michelae Libert, 1999
Stempfferia moyambina (Bethune-Baker, 1903)
Stempfferia staudingeri (Kirby, 1890)
Cephetola cephena (Hewitson, 1873)
Cephetola nigra (Bethune-Baker, 1903)
Cephetola obscura (Hawker-Smith, 1933)
Cephetola pinodes (Druce, 1890)
Cephetola subcoerulea (Roche, 1954)
Cephetola sublustris (Bethune-Baker, 1904)
Neaveia lamborni Druce, 1910
Epitolina dispar (Kirby, 1887)
Epitolina melissa (Druce, 1888)
Epitolina collinsi Libert, 2000
Epitolina catori Bethune-Baker, 1904
Hypophytala hyettina (Aurivillius, 1897)
Hypophytala hyettoides (Aurivillius, 1895)
Phytala elais catori Bethune-Baker, 1903
Aethiopana honorius divisa (Butler, 1901)
Hewitsonia boisduvalii (Hewitson, 1869)
Hewitsonia inexpectata Bouyer, 1997
Hewitsonia occidentalis Bouyer, 1997

Aphnaeinae
Pseudaletis zebra subangulata Talbot, 1935
Pseudaletis leonis (Staudinger, 1888)
Pseudaletis antimachus (Staudinger, 1888)
Lipaphnaeus aderna (Plötz, 1880)
Lipaphnaeus leonina (Sharpe, 1890)
Cigaritis avriko (Karsch, 1893)
Cigaritis iza (Hewitson, 1865)
Cigaritis mozambica (Bertoloni, 1850)
Zeritis neriene Boisduval, 1836
Axiocerses harpax (Fabricius, 1775)
Aphnaeus asterius Plötz, 1880
Aphnaeus jefferyi Hawker-Smith, 1928
Aphnaeus orcas (Drury, 1782)

Theclinae
Myrina silenus (Fabricius, 1775)
Myrina subornata Lathy, 1903
Oxylides faunus (Drury, 1773)
Dapidodigma hymen (Fabricius, 1775)
Hypolycaena antifaunus (Westwood, 1851)
Hypolycaena clenchi Larsen, 1997
Hypolycaena dubia Aurivillius, 1895
Hypolycaena hatita Hewitson, 1865
Hypolycaena lebona (Hewitson, 1865)
Hypolycaena nigra Bethune-Baker, 1914
Hypolycaena philippus (Fabricius, 1793)
Hypolycaena scintillans Stempffer, 1957
Iolaus eurisus (Cramer, 1779)
Iolaus aethria Karsch, 1893
Iolaus bellina (Plötz, 1880)
Iolaus leonis (Riley, 1928)
Iolaus maesa (Hewitson, 1862)
Iolaus moyambina (Stempffer & Bennett, 1959)
Iolaus sappirus (Druce, 1902)
Iolaus iulus Hewitson, 1869
Iolaus alcibiades Kirby, 1871
Iolaus paneperata Druce, 1890
Iolaus lukabas Druce, 1890
Iolaus calisto (Westwood, 1851)
Iolaus laonides Aurivillius, 1898
Iolaus timon (Fabricius, 1787)
Iolaus catori Bethune-Baker, 1904
Stugeta occidentalis Stempffer & Bennett, 1958 (endemic)
Pilodeudorix virgata (Druce, 1891)
Pilodeudorix catori (Bethune-Baker, 1903)
Pilodeudorix leonina (Bethune-Baker, 1904)
Pilodeudorix otraeda (Hewitson, 1863)
Pilodeudorix caerulea (Druce, 1890)
Pilodeudorix camerona (Plötz, 1880)
Pilodeudorix diyllus (Hewitson, 1878)
Pilodeudorix zela (Hewitson, 1869)
Pilodeudorix aurivilliusi (Stempffer, 1954)
Pilodeudorix kiellandi (Congdon & Collins, 1998)
Pilodeudorix violetta (Aurivillius, 1897)
Paradeudorix eleala viridis (Stempffer, 1964)
Paradeudorix moyambina (Bethune-Baker, 1904)
Paradeudorix petersi (Stempffer & Bennett, 1956)
Hypomyrina mimetica Libert, 2004
Hypomyrina fournierae Gabriel, 1939
Deudorix antalus (Hopffer, 1855)
Deudorix dinomenes diomedes Jackson, 1966
Deudorix galathea (Swainson, 1821)
Deudorix kayonza Stempffer, 1956
Deudorix lorisona (Hewitson, 1862)
Deudorix odana Druce, 1887

Polyommatinae

Lycaenesthini
Anthene amarah (Guérin-Méneville, 1849)
Anthene crawshayi (Butler, 1899)
Anthene irumu (Stempffer, 1948)
Anthene juba (Fabricius, 1787)
Anthene lachares (Hewitson, 1878)
Anthene larydas (Cramer, 1780)
Anthene liodes (Hewitson, 1874)
Anthene lunulata (Trimen, 1894)
Anthene lysicles (Hewitson, 1874)
Anthene princeps (Butler, 1876)
Anthene radiata (Bethune-Baker, 1910)
Anthene rubricinctus (Holland, 1891)
Anthene schoutedeni (Hulstaert, 1924)
Anthene scintillula aurea (Bethune-Baker, 1910)
Anthene sylvanus (Drury, 1773)
Anthene lyzanius (Hewitson, 1874)
Anthene chryseostictus (Bethune-Baker, 1910)
Anthene gemmifera (Neave, 1910)
Anthene lusones fulvimacula (Mabille, 1890)
Anthene staudingeri (Grose-Smith & Kirby, 1894)
Anthene fasciatus (Aurivillius, 1895)
Anthene hades (Bethune-Baker, 1910)
Anthene lamias (Hewitson, 1878)
Anthene lucretilis (Hewitson, 1874)
Anthene marshalli (Bethune-Baker, 1903)
Anthene nigeriae (Aurivillius, 1905)
Anthene phoenicis (Karsch, 1893)
Anthene rufoplagata (Bethune-Baker, 1910)
Cupidesthes leonina (Bethune-Baker, 1903)
Cupidesthes lithas (Druce, 1890)
Cupidesthes pungusei Collins & Larsen, 2005
Cupidesthes salvatoris Belcastro & Larsen, 2005 (endemic)

Polyommatini
Cupidopsis cissus (Godart, [1824])
Pseudonacaduba sichela (Wallengren, 1857)
Lampides boeticus (Linnaeus, 1767)
Uranothauma belcastroi Larsen, 1997
Uranothauma falkensteini (Dewitz, 1879)
Phlyaria cyara stactalla Karsch, 1895
Cacyreus audeoudi Stempffer, 1936
Cacyreus lingeus (Stoll, 1782)
Leptotes pirithous (Linnaeus, 1767)
Tuxentius carana kontu (Karsch, 1893)
Zizeeria knysna (Trimen, 1862)
Azanus mirza (Plötz, 1880)
Azanus moriqua (Wallengren, 1857)
Azanus isis (Drury, 1773)
Eicochrysops dudgeoni Riley, 1929
Eicochrysops hippocrates (Fabricius, 1793)
Euchrysops albistriata greenwoodi d'Abrera, 1980
Euchrysops barkeri (Trimen, 1893)
Euchrysops malathana (Boisduval, 1833)
Euchrysops osiris (Hopffer, 1855)
Euchrysops sahelianus Libert, 2001
Thermoniphas micylus (Cramer, 1780)
Oboronia guessfeldti (Dewitz, 1879)
Oboronia ornata (Mabille, 1890)
Lepidochrysops parsimon (Fabricius, 1775)
Lepidochrysops synchrematiza (Bethune-Baker, [1923])

Riodinidae

Nemeobiinae
Abisara gerontes (Fabricius, 1781)

Nymphalidae

Libytheinae
Libythea labdaca Westwood, 1851

Danainae

Danaini
Danaus chrysippus alcippus (Cramer, 1777)
Tirumala petiverana (Doubleday, 1847)
Amauris niavius (Linnaeus, 1758)
Amauris tartarea Mabille, 1876
Amauris damocles (Fabricius, 1793)
Amauris hecate (Butler, 1866)

Satyrinae

Elymniini
Elymniopsis bammakoo (Westwood, [1851])

Melanitini
Gnophodes betsimena parmeno Doubleday, 1849
Gnophodes chelys (Fabricius, 1793)
Melanitis leda (Linnaeus, 1758)
Melanitis libya Distant, 1882

Satyrini
Bicyclus abnormis (Dudgeon, 1909)
Bicyclus angulosa (Butler, 1868)
Bicyclus dekeyseri (Condamin, 1958)
Bicyclus dorothea (Cramer, 1779)
Bicyclus ephorus Weymer, 1892
Bicyclus evadne (Cramer, 1779)
Bicyclus funebris (Guérin-Méneville, 1844)
Bicyclus ignobilis (Butler, 1870)
Bicyclus istaris (Plötz, 1880)
Bicyclus madetes (Hewitson, 1874)
Bicyclus mandanes Hewitson, 1873
Bicyclus milyas (Hewitson, 1864)
Bicyclus nobilis (Aurivillius, 1893)
Bicyclus procora (Karsch, 1893)
Bicyclus safitza (Westwood, 1850)
Bicyclus sambulos unicolor Condamin, 1971
Bicyclus martius (Fabricius, 1793)
Bicyclus sandace (Hewitson, 1877)
Bicyclus sangmelinae Condamin, 1963
Bicyclus taenias (Hewitson, 1877)
Bicyclus trilophus jacksoni Condamin, 1961
Bicyclus vulgaris (Butler, 1868)
Bicyclus xeneas occidentalis Condamin, 1965
Bicyclus zinebi (Butler, 1869)
Hallelesis halyma (Fabricius, 1793)
Heteropsis elisi (Karsch, 1893)
Ypthima doleta Kirby, 1880
Ypthimomorpha itonia (Hewitson, 1865)

Charaxinae

Charaxini
Charaxes varanes vologeses (Mabille, 1876)
Charaxes fulvescens senegala van Someren, 1975
Charaxes candiope (Godart, 1824)
Charaxes protoclea Feisthamel, 1850
Charaxes boueti Feisthamel, 1850
Charaxes cynthia Butler, 1866
Charaxes lucretius Cramer, [1775]
Charaxes jasius Poulton, 1926
Charaxes epijasius Reiche, 1850
Charaxes castor (Cramer, 1775)
Charaxes brutus (Cramer, 1779)
Charaxes pollux (Cramer, 1775)
Charaxes eudoxus (Drury, 1782)
Charaxes numenes (Hewitson, 1859)
Charaxes tiridates (Cramer, 1777)
Charaxes smaragdalis butleri Rothschild, 1900
Charaxes imperialis Butler, 1874
Charaxes ameliae doumeti Henning, 1989
Charaxes pythodoris davidi Plantrou, 1973
Charaxes hadrianus Ward, 1871
Charaxes zingha (Stoll, 1780)
Charaxes etesipe (Godart, 1824)
Charaxes eupale (Drury, 1782)
Charaxes anticlea (Drury, 1782)
Charaxes hildebrandti gillesi Plantrou, 1973
Charaxes virilis van Someren & Jackson, 1952
Charaxes etheocles (Cramer, 1777)
Charaxes plantroui , 1975
Charaxes angelae , 1975
Charaxes viola Butler, 1866
Charaxes pleione (Godart, 1824)
Charaxes paphianus falcata (Butler, 1872)
Charaxes nichetes bouchei Plantrou, 1974
Charaxes lycurgus (Fabricius, 1793)
Charaxes zelica Butler, 1869
Charaxes porthos gallayi van Someren, 1968
Charaxes doubledayi Aurivillius, 1899
Charaxes mycerina (Godart, 1824)
Charaxes carteri Butler, 1881

Euxanthini
Charaxes eurinome (Cramer, 1775)

Pallini
Palla publius Staudinger, 1892
Palla ussheri (Butler, 1870)
Palla decius (Cramer, 1777)
Palla violinitens (Crowley, 1890)

Apaturinae
Apaturopsis cleochares (Hewitson, 1873)

Nymphalinae
Kallimoides rumia (Doubleday, 1849)
Vanessula milca (Hewitson, 1873)

Nymphalini
Antanartia delius (Drury, 1782)
Vanessa cardui (Linnaeus, 1758)
Junonia chorimene (Guérin-Méneville, 1844)
Junonia hierta cebrene Trimen, 1870
Junonia oenone (Linnaeus, 1758)
Junonia orithya madagascariensis Guenée, 1865
Junonia sophia (Fabricius, 1793)
Junonia stygia (Aurivillius, 1894)
Junonia terea (Drury, 1773)
Salamis cacta (Fabricius, 1793)
Protogoniomorpha anacardii (Linnaeus, 1758)
Protogoniomorpha parhassus (Drury, 1782)
Protogoniomorpha cytora (Doubleday, 1847)
Precis antilope (Feisthamel, 1850)
Precis coelestina Dewitz, 1879
Precis frobeniusi Strand, 1909
Precis octavia (Cramer, 1777)
Precis pelarga (Fabricius, 1775)
Precis sinuata Plötz, 1880
Hypolimnas anthedon (Doubleday, 1845)
Hypolimnas dinarcha (Hewitson, 1865)
Hypolimnas misippus (Linnaeus, 1764)
Hypolimnas salmacis (Drury, 1773)
Catacroptera cloanthe ligata Rothschild & Jordan, 1903

Cyrestinae

Cyrestini
Cyrestis camillus (Fabricius, 1781)

Biblidinae

Biblidini
Byblia anvatara crameri Aurivillius, 1894
Mesoxantha ethosea (Drury, 1782)
Ariadne albifascia (Joicey & Talbot, 1921)
Ariadne enotrea (Cramer, 1779)
Neptidopsis ophione (Cramer, 1777)
Eurytela dryope (Cramer, [1775])
Eurytela hiarbas (Drury, 1782)

Epicaliini
Sevenia boisduvali omissa (Rothschild, 1918)
Sevenia occidentalium (Mabille, 1876)
Sevenia umbrina (Karsch, 1892)

Limenitinae

Limenitidini
Harma theobene Doubleday, 1848
Cymothoe adela Staudinger, 1890
Cymothoe althea (Cramer, 1776)
Cymothoe caenis (Drury, 1773)
Cymothoe egesta (Cramer, 1775)
Cymothoe euthalioides albomarginata Neustetter, 1921
Cymothoe fumana (Westwood, 1850)
Cymothoe hartigi Belcastro, 1990
Cymothoe herminia gongoa Fox, 1965
Cymothoe jodutta (Westwood, 1850)
Cymothoe mabillei Overlaet, 1944
Cymothoe sangaris (Godart, 1824)
Pseudoneptis bugandensis ianthe Hemming, 1964
Pseudacraea boisduvalii (Doubleday, 1845)
Pseudacraea eurytus (Linnaeus, 1758)
Pseudacraea hostilia (Drury, 1782)
Pseudacraea lucretia (Cramer, [1775])
Pseudacraea semire (Cramer, 1779)
Pseudacraea warburgi Aurivillius, 1892

Neptidini
Neptis agouale Pierre-Baltus, 1978
Neptis alta Overlaet, 1955
Neptis conspicua Neave, 1904
Neptis loma Condamin, 1971
Neptis continuata Holland, 1892
Neptis najo Karsch, 1893
Neptis kiriakoffi Overlaet, 1955
Neptis melicerta (Drury, 1773)
Neptis metella (Doubleday, 1848)
Neptis mixophyes Holland, 1892
Neptis morosa Overlaet, 1955
Neptis nebrodes Hewitson, 1874
Neptis nemetes Hewitson, 1868
Neptis nicobule Holland, 1892
Neptis quintilla Mabille, 1890
Neptis nicoteles Hewitson, 1874
Neptis nysiades Hewitson, 1868
Neptis paula Staudinger, 1896
Neptis puella Aurivillius, 1894
Neptis serena Overlaet, 1955
Neptis trigonophora melicertula Strand, 1912
Neptis troundi Pierre-Baltus, 1978

Adoliadini
Catuna angustatum (Felder & Felder, 1867)
Catuna crithea (Drury, 1773)
Catuna niji Fox, 1965
Catuna oberthueri Karsch, 1894
Euryphura chalcis (Felder & Felder, 1860)
Euryphura togoensis Suffert, 1904
Euryphurana nobilis (Staudinger, 1891)
Hamanumida daedalus (Fabricius, 1775)
Aterica galene (Brown, 1776)
Cynandra opis (Drury, 1773)
Euriphene amicia gola Fox, 1965
Euriphene aridatha (Hewitson, 1866)
Euriphene taigola Sáfián & Warren-Gash, 2009
Euriphene aridatha feronia (Staudinger, 1891)
Euriphene atossa (Hewitson, 1865)
Euriphene coerulea Boisduval, 1847
Euriphene gambiae vera Hecq, 2002
Euriphene incerta (Aurivillius, 1912)
Euriphene leonis (Aurivillius, 1899)
Euriphene lomaensis Belcastro, 1986
Euriphene simplex (Staudinger, 1891)
Euriphene veronica (Stoll, 1780)
Euriphene doriclea (Drury, 1782)
Bebearia osyris (Schultze, 1920)
Bebearia carshena (Hewitson, 1871)
Bebearia absolon (Fabricius, 1793)
Bebearia zonara (Butler, 1871)
Bebearia mandinga (Felder & Felder, 1860)
Bebearia oxione (Hewitson, 1866)
Bebearia abesa (Hewitson, 1869)
Bebearia barce (Doubleday, 1847)
Bebearia mardania (Fabricius, 1793)
Bebearia cocalia (Fabricius, 1793)
Bebearia paludicola blandi Holmes, 2001
Bebearia senegalensis (Herrich-Schaeffer, 1858)
Bebearia sophus (Fabricius, 1793)
Bebearia arcadius (Fabricius, 1793)
Bebearia laetitia (Plötz, 1880)
Bebearia phantasina (Staudinger, 1891)
Bebearia demetra (Godart, 1824)
Bebearia maledicta (Strand, 1912)
Bebearia cutteri harleyi (Fox, 1968)
Euphaedra medon pholus (van der Hoeven, 1840)
Euphaedra gausape (Butler, 1866)
Euphaedra judith Weymer, 1892
Euphaedra melpomene Hecq, 1981
Euphaedra hastiri polymnie Hecq, 1981
Euphaedra xypete (Hewitson, 1865)
Euphaedra diffusa albocoerulea Hecq, 1976
Euphaedra crockeri (Butler, 1869)
Euphaedra eusemoides (Grose-Smith & Kirby, 1889)
Euphaedra cyparissa (Cramer, 1775)
Euphaedra sarcoptera (Butler, 1871)
Euphaedra themis (Hübner, 1807)
Euphaedra dubreka Collins & Larsen, 2005
Euphaedra laboureana laboureana de Toulgëot, 1957
Euphaedra laboureana eburnensis Hecq, 1979
Euphaedra minuta Hecq, 1982
Euphaedra laguerrei Hecq, 1979
Euphaedra janetta (Butler, 1871)
Euphaedra vetusta (Butler, 1871)
Euphaedra aberrans Staudinger, 1891
Euphaedra ceres (Fabricius, 1775)
Euphaedra afzelii (Felder & Felder, 1867) (endemic)
Euphaedra inanum (Butler, 1873)
Euphaedra phaethusa aurea Hecq, 1983
Euphaedra villiersi Condamin, 1964
Euphaedra francina (Godart, 1824)
Euphaedra eleus (Drury, 1782)
Euphaedra zampa (Westwood, 1850)
Euphaedra edwardsii (van der Hoeven, 1845)
Euphaedra perseis (Drury, 1773)
Euphaedra harpalyce (Cramer, 1777)
Euphaedra eupalus (Fabricius, 1781)
Euphaedra normalis Staudinger, 1891
Euptera dorothea Bethune-Baker, 1904
Euptera zowa Fox, 1965
Pseudathyma neptidina Karsch, 1894
Pseudathyma plutonica sibyllina (Staudinger, 1890)

Heliconiinae

Acraeini
Acraea camaena (Drury, 1773)
Acraea endoscota Le Doux, 1928
Acraea quirina (Fabricius, 1781)
Acraea zetes (Linnaeus, 1758)
Acraea abdera eginopsis Aurivillius, 1899
Acraea egina (Cramer, 1775)
Acraea caecilia (Fabricius, 1781)
Acraea pseudegina Westwood, 1852
Acraea rogersi Hewitson, 1873
Acraea alcinoe Felder & Felder, 1865
Acraea consanguinea sartina (Jordan, 1910)
Acraea macaria (Fabricius, 1793)
Acraea umbra (Drury, 1782)
Acraea vestalis Felder & Felder, 1865
Acraea acerata Hewitson, 1874
Acraea alciope Hewitson, 1852
Acraea aurivillii Staudinger, 1896
Acraea bonasia (Fabricius, 1775)
Acraea circeis (Drury, 1782)
Acraea encedana Pierre, 1976
Acraea serena (Fabricius, 1775)
Acraea jodutta (Fabricius, 1793)
Acraea lycoa Godart, 1819
Acraea peneleos Ward, 1871
Acraea polis Pierre, 1999
Acraea pharsalus Ward, 1871
Acraea vesperalis Grose-Smith, 1890
Acraea parrhasia (Fabricius, 1793)
Acraea perenna Doubleday, 1847

Vagrantini
Lachnoptera anticlia (Hübner, 1819)
Phalanta eurytis (Doubleday, 1847)
Phalanta phalantha aethiopica (Rothschild & Jordan, 1903)

Hesperiidae

Coeliadinae
Coeliades aeschylus (Plötz, 1884)
Coeliades chalybe (Westwood, 1852)
Coeliades forestan (Stoll, [1782])
Coeliades hanno (Plötz, 1879)
Coeliades libeon (Druce, 1875)
Coeliades pisistratus (Fabricius, 1793)
Pyrrhochalcia iphis (Drury, 1773)

Pyrginae

Celaenorrhinini
Loxolexis holocausta (Mabille, 1891)
Katreus johnstoni (Butler, 1888)
Celaenorrhinus galenus (Fabricius, 1793)
Celaenorrhinus leona Berger, 1975
Celaenorrhinus meditrina (Hewitson, 1877)
Celaenorrhinus ovalis Evans, 1937
Celaenorrhinus plagiatus Berger, 1976
Celaenorrhinus proxima maesseni Berger, 1976
Celaenorrhinus rutilans (Mabille, 1877)
Eretis lugens (Rogenhofer, 1891)
Eretis melania Mabille, 1891
Sarangesa bouvieri (Mabille, 1877)
Sarangesa brigida (Plötz, 1879)
Sarangesa majorella (Mabille, 1891)
Sarangesa tertullianus (Fabricius, 1793)
Sarangesa thecla (Plötz, 1879)
Sarangesa tricerata (Mabille, 1891)

Tagiadini
Tagiades flesus (Fabricius, 1781)
Eagris decastigma Mabille, 1891
Eagris denuba (Plötz, 1879)
Eagris hereus quaterna (Mabille, 1890)
Eagris tetrastigma subolivescens (Holland, 1892)
Calleagris lacteus dannatti (Ehrmann, 1893)
Calleagris landbecki (Druce, 1910)
Procampta rara Holland, 1892
Netrobalane canopus (Trimen, 1864)
Abantis elegantula (Mabille, 1890)
Abantis leucogaster (Mabille, 1890)
Abantis lucretia Druce, 1909
Abantis pseudonigeriana Usher, 1984

Carcharodini
Spialia dromus (Plötz, 1884)
Spialia ploetzi occidentalis de Jong, 1977
Spialia spio (Linnaeus, 1764)
Gomalia elma (Trimen, 1862)

Hesperiinae

Aeromachini
Astictopterus abjecta (Snellen, 1872)
Astictopterus anomoeus (Plötz, 1879)
Prosopalpus debilis (Plötz, 1879)
Prosopalpus styla Evans, 1937
Kedestes protensa Butler, 1901
Gorgyra aburae (Plötz, 1879)
Gorgyra afikpo Druce, 1909
Gorgyra aretina (Hewitson, 1878)
Gorgyra bina Evans, 1937
Gorgyra diversata Evans, 1937
Gorgyra heterochrus (Mabille, 1890)
Gorgyra minima Holland, 1896
Gorgyra mocquerysii Holland, 1896
Gorgyra pali Evans, 1937
Gorgyra sara Evans, 1937
Gorgyra sola Evans, 1937
Gorgyra subfacatus (Mabille, 1890)
Gyrogra subnotata (Holland, 1894)
Teniorhinus ignita (Mabille, 1877)
Teniorhinus watsoni Holland, 1892
Ceratrichia crowleyi Riley, 1925
Ceratrichia nothus (Fabricius, 1787)
Ceratrichia phocion (Fabricius, 1781)
Ceratrichia semilutea Mabille, 1891
Pardaleodes edipus (Stoll, 1781)
Pardaleodes incerta murcia (Plötz, 1883)
Pardaleodes sator (Westwood, 1852)
Pardaleodes tibullus (Fabricius, 1793)
Xanthodisca astrape (Holland, 1892)
Xanthodisca rega (Mabille, 1890)
Rhabdomantis galatia (Hewitson, 1868)
Rhabdomantis sosia (Mabille, 1891)
Osmodes adon (Mabille, 1890)
Osmodes adosus (Mabille, 1890)
Osmodes costatus Aurivillius, 1896
Osmodes distincta Holland, 1896
Osmodes laronia (Hewitson, 1868)
Osmodes lindseyi occidentalis Miller, 1971
Osmodes lux Holland, 1892
Osmodes omar Swinhoe, 1916
Osmodes thora (Plötz, 1884)
Parosmodes lentiginosa (Holland, 1896)
Paracleros biguttulus (Mabille, 1890)
Osphantes ogowena (Mabille, 1891)
Acleros mackenii olaus (Plötz, 1884)
Acleros ploetzi Mabille, 1890
Semalea arela (Mabille, 1891)
Semalea atrio (Mabille, 1891)
Semalea pulvina (Plötz, 1879)
Semalea sextilis (Plötz, 1886)
Hypoleucis tripunctata Mabille, 1891
Meza cybeutes volta Miller, 1971
Meza elba (Evans, 1937)
Meza indusiata (Mabille, 1891)
Meza leucophaea (Holland, 1894)
Meza mabea (Holland, 1894)
Meza mabillei (Holland, 1893)
Meza meza (Hewitson, 1877)
Paronymus budonga (Evans, 1938)
Paronymus xanthias (Mabille, 1891)
Andronymus caesar (Fabricius, 1793)
Andronymus evander (Mabille, 1890)
Andronymus helles Evans, 1937
Andronymus hero Evans, 1937
Andronymus neander (Plötz, 1884)
Zophopetes cerymica (Hewitson, 1867)
Gamia buchholzi (Plötz, 1879)
Artitropa comus (Stoll, 1782)
Gretna balenge zowa Lindsey & Miller, 1965
Gretna cylinda (Hewitson, 1876)
Gretna lacida (Hewitson, 1876)
Gretna waga (Plötz, 1886)
Pteroteinon caenira (Hewitson, 1867)
Pteroteinon ceucaenira (Druce, 1910)
Pteroteinon concaenira Belcastro & Larsen, 1996
Pteroteinon iricolor (Holland, 1890)
Pteroteinon laterculus (Holland, 1890)
Pteroteinon laufella (Hewitson, 1868)
Pteroteinon pruna Evans, 1937
Leona leonora (Plötz, 1879)
Leona meloui (Riley, 1926)
Leona luehderi (Plötz, 1879)
Caenides soritia (Hewitson, 1876)
Caenides xychus (Mabille, 1891)
Caenides benga (Holland, 1891)
Caenides otilia Belcastro, 1990
Caenides dacenilla Aurivillius, 1925
Caenides dacela (Hewitson, 1876)
Caenides hidaroides Aurivillius, 1896
Caenides dacena (Hewitson, 1876)
Monza alberti (Holland, 1896)
Monza cretacea (Snellen, 1872)
Melphina flavina Lindsey & Miller, 1965
Melphina malthina (Hewitson, 1876)
Melphina maximiliani Belcastro & Larsen, 2005
Melphina melphis (Holland, 1893)
Melphina statira (Mabille, 1891)
Melphina statirides (Holland, 1896)
Melphina tarace (Mabille, 1891)
Melphina unistriga (Holland, 1893)
Fresna carlo Evans, 1937
Fresna cojo (Karsch, 1893)
Fresna netopha (Hewitson, 1878)
Fresna nyassae (Hewitson, 1878)
Platylesches affinissima Strand, 1921
Platylesches batangae (Holland, 1894)
Platylesches chamaeleon (Mabille, 1891)
Platylesches galesa (Hewitson, 1877)
Platylesches iva Evans, 1937
Platylesches moritili (Wallengren, 1857)
Platylesches picanini (Holland, 1894)
Platylesches rossii Belcastro, 1986

Baorini
Pelopidas mathias (Fabricius, 1798)
Pelopidas thrax (Hübner, 1821)
Borbo borbonica (Boisduval, 1833)
Borbo fallax (Gaede, 1916)
Borbo fanta (Evans, 1937)
Borbo fatuellus (Hopffer, 1855)
Borbo gemella (Mabille, 1884)
Borbo holtzi (Plötz, 1883)
Borbo liana (Evans, 1937) (endemic)
Borbo micans (Holland, 1896)
Borbo perobscura (Druce, 1912)
Parnara monasi (Trimen & Bowker, 1889)
Gegenes hottentota (Latreille, 1824)
Gegenes niso brevicornis (Plötz, 1884)

See also 
 List of moths of Sierra Leone
 Wildlife of Sierra Leone

References

 Seitz, A. Die Gross-Schmetterlinge der Erde 13: Die Afrikanischen Tagfalter. Plates
 Seitz, A. Die Gross-Schmetterlinge der Erde 13: Die Afrikanischen Tagfalter. Text (in German)

Sierra Leone

Butterflies
Sierra Leone
Sierra Leone